Okenia luna is a species of sea slug, specifically a dorid nudibranch, a marine gastropod mollusc in the family Goniodorididae.

Distribution
This species was described from Bahia of Ancón Peru. Is distributed from Ancon, Lima Peru to Coliumo, Chile

Description
This Okenia has a broad body and seven to twelve pairs of lateral papillae.

Ecology
The diet of this species is a bryozoan, Alcyonidium nodosum.

References

Goniodorididae
Gastropods described in 1994